The Reformist Party was a Portuguese political party during the Portuguese First Republic, founded in the 1920s by the left-wing of the Democratic Party.
Defunct political parties in Portugal
Liberal parties in Portugal
Political parties with year of disestablishment missing
Political parties with year of establishment missing
Radical parties
Republicanism in Portugal